{{Automatic taxobox
| taxon = Jatrophihabitans
| grandparent_authority = Salam et al. 2020
| parent_authority = Nouioui et al. 2018
| authority = Madhaiyan et al. 2013<ref name="Madhaiyan">{{cite journal | authors = Madhaiyan M, Hu CJ, Kim SJ, Weon HY, Kwon SW, Ji L. | title = Jatrophihabitans endophyticus gen. nov., sp. nov., an endophytic actinobacterium isolated from a surface-sterilized stem of Jatropha curcas L. | journal = Int J Syst Evol Microbiol | year = 2013 | volume = 63 | issue = Pt 4 | pages = 1241–1248| doi = 10.1099/ijs.0.039685-0 | pmid = 22798659 }}</ref>
| subdivision_ranks = Species
| subdivision = 
 Jatrophihabitans endophyticus Madhaiyan et al. 2013
 Jatrophihabitans fulvus Jin et al. 2015
 Jatrophihabitans huperziae Gong et al. 2016
 Jatrophihabitans soli Kim et al. 2015
 Jatrophihabitans telluris Lee et al. 2018
| synonyms = 
}}Jatrophihabitans'' is a genus of Actinomycetota.

References

Actinomycetia
Bacteria genera